Girtesma is a monotypic moth genus of the family Erebidae. Its only species, Girtesma messala, occurs in Costa Rica. Both the genus and the species were first described by Schaus in 1913.

References

Herminiinae
Monotypic moth genera